

Bryophytes

Fish

Archosauromorphs
Data courtesy of George Olshevsky's dinosaur genera list.

Non Avian Dinosaurs

Birds

Plesiosaurs

Expeditions, field work, and fossil discoveries
 While volunteering for field work on a team led by Philip Currie, Darren Tanke learned about the lost "Eoceratops" first excavated by William Edmund Cutler. Tanke would later rediscover the specimen in London's Natural History Museum.

References

 
Paleontology
Paleontology 9